The Italair F.20 Pegaso was a twin-engine utility aircraft designed by Stelio Frati and built in Italy in 1971.

Design and development
It had the sleek lines typical of Frati's designs and was a conventional low-wing cantilever monoplane with retractable tricycle undercarriage. Construction throughout was of metal, and the aircraft was notable at the time for its high speed, much greater than that of its competitors. The prototype Pegaso was exhibited at the 1973 Paris Air Show. Before arrangements could be made to produce the aircraft in series, however, Italair ran out of money, and the rights to the design reverted to Frati.

In the early 1980s, Frati designed a modernised version of the aircraft, powered by Allison 250 turboprop engines in place of the Pegaso's piston engines and equipped with a large sliding bubble canopy. 
Built by Frati's own company, General Avia, and named the F.20TP Condor, this version first flew on 7 May 1983. Frati hoped that this version might attract military buyers who could use it for training, maritime patrol, or even ground attack, and the prototype was equipped with two pylons under each wing to demonstrate its capacity to carry external stores. Although exhibited at the Paris Air Show in 1985, development of the Condor was postponed in favour of the Promavia Jet Squalus that Frati was working on at the time, and was eventually abandoned.

Specifications (F.20 Pegaso)

References

Further reading

 
 
 

1970s Italian civil utility aircraft
Low-wing aircraft
Aircraft first flown in 1971
Twin piston-engined tractor aircraft